The Rising Tour was a lengthy, worldwide, top-grossing concert tour featuring Bruce Springsteen and the E Street Band that took place in arenas and stadiums over 2002 and 2003.  It followed the release of their 2002 album The Rising.

Itinerary
Tour preparations began in late July and early August 2002 with closed and then semi-open rehearsals, and then several public rehearsal shows, at Asbury Park, New Jersey's Convention Hall, as well as a highly advertised early morning promotional appearance there on NBC's The Today Show. He also appeared on Late Night with David Letterman on CBS, NBC's Saturday Night Live, and Nightline on ABC. His Nightline interview was one of the most revealing of his career.  Usually a very private person, Springsteen agreed to all of these appearances as part of the biggest promotional effort of his career for the tour and its album.

The first leg of the tour formally began on August 7, 2002, with an opening show in Springsteen's home floor of Continental Airlines Arena in New Jersey.  This commenced what Springsteen's management called their "Barnstorming" , playing 46 arena shows in 46 different cities in North America (39) and Western Europe (7) through the end of the year, ending on December 17 at Conseco Fieldhouse in Indianapolis.  The idea was to maximize the publicity effect of the tour for aiding sales of the already heavily promoted new album by visiting as many markets as possible.  The attendant publicity would only be increased if tickets were hard to come by, which was the case in Springsteen hot spots which were accustomed to multiple-night stands.  The strategy appeared to succeed, as The Rising did well commercially and became Springsteen's best-selling album of new material in 15 years.

After a break of more than two months in winter, the second leg of the tour began on February 28, 2003, with 7 more one-night stands in the United States.  The band then travelled to Australia and New Zealand in March for five shows down under.  They then quickly returned to North America for 6 more barnstorming shows in April, mostly in Canada.

After a three-week break, barnstorming was over and the promised third leg of multiple-show stands was on.  The tour went back to Western Europe, this time satisfying much pent-up demand by playing 24 shows in May and June, all in stadiums, with multiple dates in cities where necessary.  These dates began in Feyenoord Stadion in Rotterdam and ended in Stadio San Siro in Milan. Shows in Europe were hugely successful, and for example in Scandinavia, shows in Finland, Sweden, Norway and Denmark sold out in a record two hours. Now it was time for North America to get the same treatment.  From mid-July through early October, the band played 33 dates in stadiums (with an intentional emphasis on baseball parks as venues in addition to the usual professional football stadiums), mostly composed of multiple-night stands along the Eastern Seaboard where Springsteen was most popular, starting with what would become 10 shows in New Jersey's Giants Stadium.  These were Springsteen's first full appearances in United States stadiums since the 1985 leg of his Born in the U.S.A. Tour, and included visits to icons such as Fenway Park and Dodger Stadium. The Rising Tour finally concluded on October 4, 2003, at Shea Stadium in New York City.

In all, the tour played 120 shows in 82 cities over a span of 14 months.

Tour dates

The show
Not surprisingly, songs from The Rising played a key role in the structure of the tour's shows.  Concerts
typically began with "The Rising" followed by "Lonesome Day", both songs about the September 11, 2001, terrorist attacks.  New E Streeter Soozie Tyrell's violin played a prominent role in establishing the texture of these numbers, as it would throughout the concert.  Two more September 11 songs, "Empty Sky" and "You're Missing", appeared soon after, to continue the mood; the latter featured an extended instrumental coda from the band, led by Danny Federici's organ. Typically seven or eight songs into the show, "Waitin' on a Sunny Day" provided the first buoyant, happy moments. Springsteen's first-ever use of recorded backing music took place on the mid-show "Worlds Apart", where Middle Eastern vocals were applied. The role of elongated band introductions song for this tour was taken by "Mary's Place", which also usually included interpolations of R&B classics.  The main set closer was a final September 11 number, "Into the Fire", which, relevant to the new album's themes, emphasized togetherness and praise for sacrifice rather than the pure exuberance of previous tours' closers such as "Rosalita" and "Light of Day".  (A few Rising songs were almost never played during the tour, including "Nothing Man", the quiet "Paradise", and the unusually rhythmic "Let's Be Friends".)

For the rest of the main set, a mixture of songs from throughout Springsteen's catalog would emerge.  Set lists were unusually static during the barnstorming (perhaps due to not having to play multiple shows in a venue, although plenty of the faithful were traveling to multiple cities to see the tour), but gradually loosened up.  One consistent mid-show mainstay was "Badlands", which never failed to bring audiences to their feet. The next-to-last spot in the main set was often reserved for Springsteen playing a heretofore unusual solo piano spot, running through an old classic such as "For You" or "Incident on 57th Street".

First encores of shows were typically fun and upbeat, featuring the return after a long absence of Springsteen's biggest hit single, "Dancing in the Dark" (in a more rock-oriented arrangement), mindless numbers such as "Ramrod", and concluding with his signature song, "Born to Run".  Second encores were typically more thematic, centered around "My City of Ruins", the return of the full band version of "Born in the U.S.A.", and the benedictory "Land of Hope and Dreams".

Some of the second leg shows took place during the run-up to, and March 20, 2003, start of, the Iraq War.  Springsteen took note of this, reviving his 1980s hit rendition of Edwin Starr's classic protest song "War" and opening the March 2 Frank Erwin Center show in United States President George W. Bush's old Austin, Texas, backyard with it.  All four Australian shows opened with an acoustic "Born in the U.S.A." before the band kicked in with "War".  The March 22 show at Sydney Cricket Ground featured three large power blackouts, the first of which came after the opening chords of "War", but the crowd led Springsteen through mass sing-alongs to Max Weinberg's unamplified drums nonetheless.

In the European stadium dates, the solo piano spot gave way to a rotating epic slot for "Jungleland", "Racing in the Street", and the like, and a new high-energy cover, "Seven Nights to Rock", became a regular in the encores, as did extended boogie piano solos by Roy Bittan.  The final European show in Milan's Stadio San Siro was said by some fans, as well as by Springsteen manager Jon Landau, to be "one of the four or five best Bruce shows of all time."  By the time summer 2003 rolled around and the United States multiple night stadium dates were being played, the feel of the show became somewhat looser.  As each show was about to begin, the stage video screens would show Springsteen and the band relaxedly walking in from backstage, while Frank Sinatra's classic recording of "Summer Wind" was aired.  The second encores also brought a treat for audiences, as "Rosalita" made fully regular appearances for the first time since 1988.

During the ten Giants Stadium shows especially, Springsteen thanked those fans who were attending multiple shows and those who were coming from long distances or out of the country; the advent of robust Bruce-oriented online communities had made these practices easier.  The final Giants Stadium show concluded with a performance of "Jersey Girl".

In the two shows immediately following the September 12, 2003, death of Johnny Cash, Springsteen paid tribute by opening each show with an acoustic rendition of Cash's "I Walk The Line".

The Rising Tour would come to a final conclusion in the early autumn with three nights in Shea Stadium, where a brouhaha emerged.  The New York Police Department had given Springsteen a personal boat escort for the first show (in addition to giving E Streeter Max Weinberg an escort because he was running late). But then Springsteen had made a rare (for this tour) performance of "American Skin (41 Shots)", a song about the NYPD shooting of Amadou Diallo, in that show.  The NYPD took revenge by removing Springsteen's escort for the second show.  They were criticized by Mayor Michael Bloomberg and others for doing this, and the escort was restored for the third and final night.   
Bob Dylan was a surprise guest on that last night, with Springsteen saying, "We have my great friend and inspiration with us tonight, Mr. Bob Dylan ... we wouldn't be here tonight without him."  The two performed Dylan's "Highway 61 Revisited" together.

Songs performed

Critical and commercial reception
Reviews of The Rising Tour were generally favorable. 

A reviewer for PopMatters found an early New York City barnstorming show to be the first Springsteen show he'd seen that lived up to the classic Springsteen he imagined from the 1970s and early 1980s.  As a response to the tour's role in helping fans mourn after 9/11, David Segal wrote in a review which appeared the Washington Post, "Lordy, lordy, we needed that. We needed Bruce Springsteen even more than we thought, and we thought we needed him a lot."
CLUAS.com reported that a May 2003 Munich show featured tight playing, and that the general admission "pit" was a Tower of Babel of different languages from fans come from all over Europe.   National Review Online thought that the tour had gotten much better in 2003 than it had been the year before and that a full-band "Incident on 57th Street" played in Philadelphia had been especially strong. 

E Street drummer Max Weinberg gave his own assessment:  "Playing for a country that was so much in pain from the events of 9/11 made the Rising Tour so much more than a series of rock concerts. People looked to us — actually they looked to the music — to quiet their sorrows. At first it seemed like the responsibility hoisted on us was too much. How could rock musicians meet these expectations? But somehow we did it. Somehow the tour was a great success." [Santelli, p. 89]

While Springsteen's popularity had dipped over the years in some southern and midwestern regions of the United States, it was still quite strong in Europe and along the United States coasts, as exemplified by the unprecedented 10 nights he played in outdoor football Giants Stadium in New Jersey, a ticket-selling feat that no other musical act can come close to. .  Reuters reported that those 10 nights alone resulted in 566,560 tickets being sold and a gross of $38.8 million, a world record for one engagement.   The Giants Stadium management reported that ticket buyers to those shows came from all 50 states and all over the world; they had celebrated the event by building a huge boardwalk and amusement park in the parking lot next to the stadium. 

Overall, according to Billboard Boxscore, the tour grossed $221.5 million over its two years.   Reuters reported a $172.7 million gross worldwide for 2003 , while Pollstar reported a $115.9 million gross within North America for 2003, the best of any act that year, and the second-best ever at the time.   Rolling Stone reported that Springsteen kept a bigger share of concert gross receipts than almost anyone, due to better deals with promoters and venues, to lower expenses for not having any fancy stage props or special effects, and to his New Jersey fans buying more merchandise than the average  (the Giants Stadium shows had specially numbered and colored T-shirts for each night of the stand).

Broadcasts and recordings
The first half of the October 16, 2002, show in Barcelona's Palau Sant Jordi was televised live across Europe on MTV Europe and VH1 UK.  A tape of the broadcast was aired by CBS in the United States on February 28, 2003, one day prior to the United States summer stadium show tickets going on sale.

That entire concert was then released as a two-disc DVD, Live in Barcelona, on November 18, 2003, the first time any Springsteen concert had been officially released in full.  The DVD opened with his performance of the title song, "The Rising". It also included a documentary, Drop the Needle and Pray: The Rising on Tour, with interviews and additional concert snippets from some of the United States summer stadium dates, including a clip compilation from the shows at Fenway Park entitled "Night of the Living Boss".  (The last three nights of the Giants Stadium, both shows at Fenway Park, and all three Shea Stadium shows were filmed in full, but have otherwise not seen release.)

The June 16, 2003, show at the Helsinki Olympic Stadium was released through the Bruce Springsteen Archives in October 2018. Live audio of this tour was noted to be difficult to release due to being recorded using proprietary audio software that has since become out of date.

Personnel

The E Street Band
 Bruce Springsteen – lead vocals, most lead guitars, harmonica, occasional piano
 Roy Bittan – piano, synthesizer
 Clarence Clemons – saxophone, background vocals
 Danny Federici – organ, electronic glockenspiel, accordion
 Nils Lofgren – guitars, pedal steel guitar, dobro, banjo, background vocals
 Patti Scialfa – acoustic guitar, background vocals, some featured duet vocals, electric guitar on Ramrod
 Garry Tallent – bass guitar
 Steven Van Zandt – guitars, mandolin, background vocals
 Max Weinberg – drums

with:
 Soozie Tyrell – violin, percussion, background vocals

Scialfa missed some shows in Europe due to family duties.

The only change from the 1999–2000 Reunion Tour line-up was the addition of Tyrell.

See also
 List of highest grossing concert tours

Sources
 Santelli, Robert.  Greetings From E Street: The Story of Bruce Springsteen and the E Street Band.  Chronicle Books, 2006.  .
 Springsteen's official website does not have much on the 2002–2003 period anymore.
 Shore Fire Media press release archives are useful for understanding scheme behind the tour.
 Live in Barcelona DVD cover notes.
 Backstreets.com's 2002 set lists and show descriptions and Backstreets.com's 2003 set lists and show descriptions capture the contents and feel of each show; unfortunately, they are not structured as to allow direct linking to individual shows.
 Killing Floor's concert database gives valuable coverage as well, but also does not support direct linking to individual dates.

References

Notes

External links
 THE RISING TOUR 2003-2003 FINAL TOUR STATISTICS

Bruce Springsteen concert tours
2002 concert tours
2003 concert tours